The 2010 Northwestern State Demons football team represented Northwestern State University as a member of the Southland Conference during the 2010 NCAA Division I FCS football season. Led by second-year head coach Bradley Dale Peveto, the Demons compiled an overall record of 5–6 with a mark of 4–3 in conference play, placing in a three-way tie for third in the Southland. Northwestern State played home games at Harry Turpin Stadium in Natchitoches, Louisiana.

Schedule

References

Northwestern State
Northwestern State Demons football seasons
Northwestern State Demons football